The Tentulia River, called Ilsha for part of its length, is located in Bangladesh. It is one of the larger coastal rivers of the Ganges-Padma system, and a major flow of the Meghna River.

References

Rivers of Bangladesh
Rivers of Barisal Division